Phyllophilopsis nitens is a species of bristle fly in the family Tachinidae.

Distribution
Canada, United States.

References

Diptera of North America
Exoristinae
Tachinidae genera
Taxa named by Daniel William Coquillett
Insects described in 1899